The 2019–20 Milwaukee Bucks season was the 52nd season of the franchise in the National Basketball Association (NBA). The Bucks entered the season following a playoff defeat in six games from the Toronto Raptors in the Eastern Conference Finals. The Bucks had the best team defensive rating in the NBA.

On February 23, 2020, the Bucks became the first team to clinch a playoff berth after the Chicago Bulls defeated the Washington Wizards. The season was suspended by the league officials following the games of March 11 after it was reported that Rudy Gobert tested positive for COVID-19. The Bucks returned to play on July 31 against the Boston Celtics at the ESPN Wide World of Sports Complex in Orlando, Florida.

The Bucks were 53–9 (.855) early in March before losing three straight games before the season was suspended on March 11 due to the COVID-19 pandemic. When the format of the 2020 NBA Bubble announced, Bucks won the Central Division on June 4 and tied Detroit Pistons' record of 9 Central Division titles. After a 23-point comeback win over the Miami Heat, the Bucks clinched the top seed in the Eastern Conference for the second consecutive season as well as the best NBA record overall for the shortened season at 56–17, or roughly 63–19 in a full season. The Bucks faced the Orlando Magic in the First Round. In a significant development following the shooting of Jacob Blake in Kenosha, Wisconsin, the Bucks led a strike in solidarity with the Black Lives Matter rioters, refusing to play Game 5 of their series against the Magic on August 26. On September 8, the Milwaukee Bucks season came to an end when the 5th seeded Miami Heat eliminated them in a five-game upset in the Conference Semifinals. This season was also Kyle Korver's last in the NBA as he spent the entire 2020-21 season as a free agent and subsequently retired on August 12, 2021 for family reasons. The 51st pick in the 2003 draft, Korver's retirement left LeBron James, Carmelo Anthony, and Udonis Haslem as the only remaining active players from the early 2000s.

Draft picks

The Bucks only held a first-round pick. That pick would then be traded to the Detroit Pistons, which would again be transferred to the Cleveland Cavaliers.

Roster

Standings

Division

Conference

Game log

Preseason
The preseason schedule was announced on July 23, 2019.

|- style="background:#cfc"
| 1
| October 7
| @ Chicago
| 
| Mason III, Lopez (14)
| Thanasis Antetokounmpo (10)
| Frank Mason (6)
| United Center17,036
| 1–0
|- style="background:#cfc"
| 2
| October 9
| Utah
| 
| Giannis Antetokounmpo (22)
| Giannis Antetokounmpo (11)
| Frank Mason (6)
| Fiserv Forum13,915
| 2–0
|- style="background:#cfc"
| 3
| October 11
| @ Dallas
| 
| Giannis Antetokounmpo (34)
| Giannis Antetokounmpo (11)
| Antetokounmpo, Middleton, Hill (4)
| American Airlines Center17,082
| 3–0
|- style="background:#cfc"
| 4
| October 13
| @ Washington
| 
| Khris Middleton (22)
| Khris Middleton (9)
| Middleton, Mason III, Matthews (4)
| Capital One Arena10,216
| 4–0
|- style="background:#cfc"
| 5
| October 17
| Minnesota
| 
| Giannis Antetokounmpo (26)
| Giannis Antetokounmpo (14)
| Khris Middleton (7)
| Fiserv Forum16,148
| 5–0

Regular season

|- style="background:#cfc;"
| 1
| October 24
| @ Houston
| 
| Giannis Antetokounmpo (30)
| Giannis Antetokounmpo (13)
| Giannis Antetokounmpo (11)
| Toyota Center18,055
| 1–0
|- style="background:#fcc;"
| 2
| October 26
| Miami
| 
| Giannis Antetokounmpo (29)
| Giannis Antetokounmpo (17)
| Giannis Antetokounmpo (9)
| Fiserv Forum17,467
| 1–1
|- style="background:#cfc;"
| 3
| October 28
| Cleveland
| 
| Khris Middleton (21)
| Giannis Antetokounmpo (10)
| Eric Bledsoe (8)
| Fiserv Forum17,385
| 2–1
|- style="background:#fcc;"
| 4
| October 30
| @ Boston
| 
| Khris Middleton (26)
| Giannis Antetokounmpo (14)
| Antetokounmpo, Bledsoe (5)
| TD Garden18,624
| 2–2

|- style="background:#cfc;"
| 5
| November 1
| @ Orlando
| 
| Giannis Antetokounmpo (29)
| Giannis Antetokounmpo (14)
| Antetokounmpo, Bledsoe (6)
| Amway Center15,105
| 3–2
|- style="background:#cfc;"
| 6
| November 2
| Toronto
| 
| Giannis Antetokounmpo (36)
| Giannis Antetokounmpo (15)
| Giannis Antetokounmpo (8)
| Fiserv Forum17,637
| 4–2
|- style="background:#cfc;"
| 7
| November 4
| @ Minnesota
| 
| Giannis Antetokounmpo (34)
| Giannis Antetokounmpo (15)
| Antetokounmpo, Bledsoe (6)
| Target Center16,271
| 5–2
|- style="background:#cfc;"
| 8
| November 6
| @ L. A. Clippers
| 
| Giannis Antetokounmpo (38)
| Giannis Antetokounmpo (16)
| Giannis Antetokounmpo (9)
| Staples Center19,068
| 6–2
|- style="background:#fcc;"
| 9
| November 8
| @ Utah
| 
| Giannis Antetokounmpo (30)
| Giannis Antetokounmpo (13)
| Eric Bledsoe (5)
| Vivint Smart Home Arena18,306
| 6–3
|- style="background:#cfc;"
| 10
| November 10
| @ Oklahoma City
| 
| Giannis Antetokounmpo (35)
| Giannis Antetokounmpo (16)
| Eric Bledsoe (9)
| Chesapeake Energy Arena18,203
| 7–3
|- style="background:#cfc;"
| 11
| November 14
| Chicago
| 
| Giannis Antetokounmpo (38)
| Giannis Antetokounmpo (16)
| Eric Bledsoe (8)
| Fiserv Forum17,627
| 8–3
|- style="background:#cfc;"
| 12
| November 16
| @ Indiana
| 
| Giannis Antetokounmpo (26)
| Giannis Antetokounmpo (13)
| Giannis Antetokounmpo (6)
| Bankers Life Fieldhouse17,024
| 9–3
|- style="background:#cfc;"
| 13
| November 18
| @ Chicago
| 
| Giannis Antetokounmpo (33)
| Lopez, Antetokounmpo (10)
| Sterling Brown (6)
| United Center17,565
| 10–3
|- style="background:#cfc;"
| 14
| November 20
| @ Atlanta
| 
| Giannis Antetokounmpo (33)
| Giannis Antetokounmpo (11)
| Eric Bledsoe (5)
| State Farm Arena16,441
| 11–3
|- style="background:#cfc;"
| 15
| November 21
| Portland
| 
| Eric Bledsoe (30)
| Giannis Antetokounmpo (19)
| Giannis Antetokounmpo (15)
| Fiserv Forum17,385
| 12–3
|- style="background:#cfc;"
| 16
| November 23
| Detroit
| 
| Giannis Antetokounmpo (28)
| Antetokounmpo, Brown (10)
| Eric Bledsoe (5)
| Fiserv Forum17,585
| 13–3
|- style="background:#cfc;"
| 17
| November 25
| Utah
| 
| Giannis Antetokounmpo (50)
| Giannis Antetokounmpo (14)
| Giannis Antetokounmpo (6)
| Fiserv Forum17,385
| 14–3
|- style="background:#cfc;"
| 18
| November 27
| Atlanta
| 
| Giannis Antetokounmpo (30)
| Giannis Antetokounmpo (10)
| Eric Bledsoe (10)
| Fiserv Forum17,525
| 15–3
|- style="background:#cfc;"
| 19
| November 29
| @ Cleveland
| 
| Giannis Antetokounmpo (33)
| Giannis Antetokounmpo (12)
| Middleton, Bledsoe (5)
| Rocket Mortgage FieldHouse19,432
| 16–3
|- style="background:#cfc;"
| 20
| November 30
| Charlotte
| 
| Giannis Antetokounmpo (26)
| Pat Connaughton (10)
| Eric Bledsoe (10)
| Fiserv Forum17,550
| 17–3

|- style="background:#cfc;"
| 21
| December 2
| New York
| 
| Giannis Antetokounmpo (29)
| Giannis Antetokounmpo (15)
| Kyle Korver (5)
| Fiserv Forum17,385
| 18–3
|- style="background:#cfc;"
| 22
| December 4
| @ Detroit
| 
| Giannis Antetokounmpo (35)
| Giannis Antetokounmpo (9)
| Eric Bledsoe (6)
| Little Caesars Arena15,742
| 19–3
|- style="background:#cfc;"
| 23
| December 6
| L. A. Clippers
| 
| Giannis Antetokounmpo (27)
| Giannis Antetokounmpo (11)
| Middleton, Bledsoe (5)
| Fiserv Forum17,732
| 20–3
|- style="background:#cfc;"
| 24
| December 9
| Orlando
| 
| Giannis Antetokounmpo (32)
| Giannis Antetokounmpo (15)
| Antetokounmpo, Bledsoe (8)
| Fiserv Forum17,385
| 21–3
|- style="background:#cfc;"
| 25
| December 11
| New Orleans
| 
| Eric Bledsoe (29)
| Ersan İlyasova (9)
| Eric Bledsoe (6)
| Fiserv Forum17,385
| 22–3
|- style="background:#cfc;"
| 26
| December 13
| @ Memphis
| 
| Giannis Antetokounmpo (37)
| Giannis Antetokounmpo (11)
| George Hill (5)
| FedExForum16,109
| 23–3
|- style="background:#cfc;"
| 27
| December 14
| Cleveland
| 
| Giannis Antetokounmpo (29)
| Robin Lopez (6)
| Khris Middleton (6)
| Fiserv Forum17,481
| 24–3
|- style="background:#fcc;"
| 28
| December 16
| Dallas
| 
| Giannis Antetokounmpo (48)
| Giannis Antetokounmpo (14)
| Donte DiVincenzo (9)
| Fiserv Forum17,727
| 24–4
|- style="background:#cfc;"
| 29
| December 19
| L. A. Lakers
| 
| Giannis Antetokounmpo (34)
| Giannis Antetokounmpo (11)
| Giannis Antetokounmpo (7)
| Fiserv Forum18,051
| 25–4
|- style="background:#cfc;"
| 30
| December 21
| @ New York
| 
| Khris Middleton (23)
| Giannis Antetokounmpo (11)
| Giannis Antetokounmpo (10)
| Madison Square Garden18,129
| 26–4
|- style="background:#cfc;"
| 31
| December 22
| Indiana
| 
| Wesley Matthews (19)
| Giannis Antetokounmpo (19)
| Giannis Antetokounmpo (9)
| Fiserv Forum18,029
| 27–4
|- style="background:#fcc;"
| 32
| December 25
| @ Philadelphia
| 
| Khris Middleton (31)
| Giannis Antetokounmpo (14)
| Giannis Antetokounmpo (7)
| Wells Fargo Center21,028
| 27–5
|- style="background:#cfc;"
| 33
| December 27
| @ Atlanta
| 
| Khris Middleton (23)
| Ersan İlyasova (17)
| Khris Middleton (7)
| State Farm Arena17,358
| 28–5
|- style="background:#cfc;"
| 34
| December 28
| Orlando
| 
| Khris Middleton (21)
| Ersan İlyasova (14)
| Khris Middleton (7)
| Fiserv Forum17,920
| 29–5
|- style="background:#cfc;"
| 35
| December 30
| @ Chicago
| 
| Khris Middleton (25)
| Ersan İlyasova (11)
| Giannis Antetokounmpo (6)
| United Center21,954
| 30–5

|- style="background:#cfc;"
| 36
| January 1
| Minnesota
| 
| Giannis Antetokounmpo (32)
| Giannis Antetokounmpo (17)
| Antetokounmpo, Middleton (4)
| Fiserv Forum17,819
| 31–5
|- style="background:#cfc;"
| 37
| January 4
| San Antonio
| 
| Giannis Antetokounmpo (32)
| Giannis Antetokounmpo (8)
| Korver, Bledsoe (6)
| Fiserv Forum18,002
| 32–5
|- style="background:#fcc;"
| 38
| January 6
| @ San Antonio
| 
| Giannis Antetokounmpo (24)
| Giannis Antetokounmpo (12)
| Giannis Antetokounmpo (8)
| AT&T Center18,354
| 32–6
|- style="background:#cfc;"
| 39
| January 8
| @ Golden State
| 
| Giannis Antetokounmpo (30)
| Giannis Antetokounmpo (12)
| Khris Middleton (6)
| Chase Center18,064
| 33–6
|- style="background:#cfc;"
| 40
| January 10
| @ Sacramento
| 
| Khris Middleton (27)
| Sterling Brown (12)
| George Hill (6)
| Golden 1 Center17,583
| 34–6
|- style="background:#cfc;"
| 41
| January 11
| @ Portland
| 
| Giannis Antetokounmpo (32)
| Giannis Antetokounmpo (17)
| Giannis Antetokounmpo (6)
| Moda Center19,843
| 35–6
|- style="background:#cfc;"
| 42
| January 14
| New York
| 
| Giannis Antetokounmpo (37)
| Giannis Antetokounmpo (9)
| Antetokounmpo, DiVincenzo (4)
| Fiserv Forum17,590
| 36–6
|- style="background:#cfc;"
| 43
| January 16
| Boston
| 
| Giannis Antetokounmpo (32)
| Giannis Antetokounmpo (17)
| Giannis Antetokounmpo (7)
| Fiserv Forum17,873
| 37–6
|- style="background:#cfc;"
| 44
| January 18
| @ Brooklyn
| 
| Giannis Antetokounmpo (29)
| Giannis Antetokounmpo (12)
| Eric Bledsoe (5)
| Barclays Center17,732
| 38–6
|- style="background:#cfc;"
| 45
| January 20
| Chicago
| 
| Giannis Antetokounmpo (28)
| Giannis Antetokounmpo (14)
| Giannis Antetokounmpo (10)
| Fiserv Forum17,747
| 39–6
|- style="background:#cfc;"
| 46
| January 24
| @ Charlotte
| 
| Giannis Antetokounmpo (30)
| Giannis Antetokounmpo (16)
| Giannis Antetokounmpo (6)
| AccorHotels Arena15,758
| 40–6
|- style="background:#cfc;"
| 47
| January 28
| Washington
| 
| Khris Middleton (51)
| Khris Middleton (10)
| Eric Bledsoe (10)
| Fiserv Forum17,681
| 41–6
|- style="background:#fcc;"
| 48
| January 31
| Denver
| 
| Giannis Antetokounmpo (31)
| Giannis Antetokounmpo (16)
| Antetokounmpo, Middleton (9)
| Fiserv Forum18,141
| 41–7

|- style="background:#cfc;"
| 49
| February 2
| Phoenix
| 
| Giannis Antetokounmpo (30)
| Giannis Antetokounmpo (19)
| Giannis Antetokounmpo (9)
| Fiserv Forum17,754
| 42–7
|- style="background:#cfc;"
| 50
| February 4
| @ New Orleans
| 
| Giannis Antetokounmpo (34)
| Giannis Antetokounmpo (17)
| Khris Middleton (8)
| Smoothie King Center15,424
| 43–7
|- style="background:#cfc;"
| 51
| February 6
| Philadelphia
| 
| Giannis Antetokounmpo (36)
| Giannis Antetokounmpo (20)
| Antetokounmpo, Bledsoe (6)
| Fiserv Forum17,928
| 44–7
|- style="background:#cfc;"
| 52
| February 8
| @ Orlando
| 
| Brook Lopez (23)
| Giannis Antetokounmpo (18)
| Giannis Antetokounmpo (9)
| Amway Center16,632
| 45–7
|- style="background:#cfc;"
| 53
| February 10
| Sacramento
| 
| Bledsoe, Middleton (28)
| Khris Middleton (11)
| Bledsoe, Middleton (8)
| Fiserv Forum17,463
| 46–7
|- style="background:#fcc;"
| 54
| February 12
| @ Indiana
| 
| Donte DiVincenzo (19)
| Brown, DiVincenzo (8)
| Khris Middleton (5)
| Bankers Life Fieldhouse17,018
| 46–8
|- style="background:#cfc;"
| 55
| February 20
| @ Detroit
| 
| Giannis Antetokounmpo (33)
| Giannis Antetokounmpo (16)
| Eric Bledsoe (6)
| Little Caesars Arena16,097
| 47–8
|- style="background:#cfc;"
| 56
| February 22
| Philadelphia
| 
| Giannis Antetokounmpo (31)
| Giannis Antetokounmpo (17)
| Antetokounmpo, Bledsoe (8)
| Fiserv Forum18,290
| 48–8
|- style="background:#cfc;"
| 57
| February 24
| @ Washington
| 
| Khris Middleton (40)
| Giannis Antetokounmpo (14)
| Eric Bledsoe (10)
| Capital One Arena16,580
| 49–8
|- style="background:#cfc;"
| 58
| February 25
| @ Toronto
| 
| Khris Middleton (22)
| Giannis Antetokounmpo (19)
| Giannis Antetokounmpo (8)
| Scotiabank Arena19,993
| 50–8
|- style="background:#cfc;"
| 59
| February 28
| Oklahoma City
| 
| Giannis Antetokounmpo (32)
| Giannis Antetokounmpo (13)
| Antetokounmpo, Hill (6)
| Fiserv Forum18,412
| 51–8

|- style="background:#cfc;"
| 60
| March 1
| @ Charlotte
| 
| Giannis Antetokounmpo (41)
| Giannis Antetokounmpo (20)
| Giannis Antetokounmpo (6)
| Spectrum Center19,149
| 52–8
|- style="background:#fcc;"
| 61
| March 2
| @ Miami
| 
| Brook Lopez (21)
| Giannis Antetokounmpo (15)
| Eric Bledsoe (4)
| American Airlines Arena19,600
| 52–9
|- style="background:#cfc;"
| 62
| March 4
| Indiana
| 
| Giannis Antetokounmpo (29)
| Giannis Antetokounmpo (12)
| Eric Bledsoe (7)
| Fiserv Forum17,695
| 53–9
|- style="background:#fcc;"
| 63
| March 6
| @ L. A. Lakers
| 
| Giannis Antetokounmpo (32)
| Giannis Antetokounmpo (11)
| Giannis Antetokounmpo (6)
| Staples Center18,997
| 53–10
|- style="background:#fcc;"
| 64
| March 8
| @ Phoenix
| 
| Khris Middleton (39)
| DiVincenzo, İlyasova (7)
| Eric Bledsoe (7)
| Talking Stick Resort Arena17,282
| 53–11
|- style="background:#fcc;"
| 65
| March 9
| @ Denver
| 
| Kyle Korver (23)
| D. J. Wilson (9)
| Frank Mason III (5)
| Pepsi Center19,838
| 53–12
|- style="background:#ccc;"

|- style="background:#cfc;"
| 66
| July 31
| Boston
| 
| Giannis Antetokounmpo (36)
| Giannis Antetokounmpo (15)
| Khris Middleton (8)
| HP Field HouseNo In-Person Attendance
| 54–12
|- style="background:#fcc;"
| 67
| August 2
| @ Houston
| 
| Giannis Antetokounmpo (36)
| Giannis Antetokounmpo (18)
| Giannis Antetokounmpo (8)
| AdventHealth ArenaNo In-Person Attendance
| 54–13
|- style="background:#fcc;"
| 68
| August 4
| Brooklyn
| 
| Giannis Antetokounmpo (16)
| Ersan İlyasova (10)
| Donte DiVincenzo (6)
| Visa Athletic CenterNo In-Person Attendance
| 54–14
|- style="background:#cfc;"
| 69
| August 6
| Miami
| 
| Antetokounmpo, Middleton (30)
| Giannis Antetokounmpo (12)
| Khris Middleton (8)
| AdventHealth ArenaNo In-Person Attendance
| 55–14
|- style="background:#fcc;"
| 70
| August 8
| @ Dallas
| 
| Giannis Antetokounmpo (34)
| Giannis Antetokounmpo (13)
| Khris Middleton (11)
| AdventHealth ArenaNo In-Person Attendance
| 55–15
|- style="background:#fcc;"
| 71
| August 10
| Toronto
| 
| Kyle Korver (19)
| Donte DiVincenzo (9)
| Eric Bledsoe (8)
| HP Field HouseNo In-Person Attendance
| 55–16
|- style="background:#cfc;"
| 72
| August 11
| @ Washington
| 
| Brook Lopez (24)
| Giannis Antetokounmpo (9)
| Hill, Mason III (6)
| Visa Athletic CenterNo In-Person Attendance
| 56–16
|- style="background:#fcc;"
| 73
| August 13
| @ Memphis
| 
| Brook Lopez (19)
| Brook Lopez (9)
| Frank Mason III (8)
| Visa Athletic CenterNo In-Person Attendance
| 56–17

|- style="background:#;"
| 66
| March 12
| Boston
| 
|
|
|
| Fiserv Forum
|
|- style="background:#;"
| 67
| March 14
| Golden State
| 
|
|
|
| Fiserv Forum
|
|- style="background:#;"
| 68
| March 16
| Miami
| 
|
|
|
| Fiserv Forum
|
|- style="background:#;"
| 69
| March 19
| Memphis
| 
|
|
|
| Fiserv Forum
|
|- style="background:#;"
| 70
| March 21
| @ Washington
| 
|
|
|
| Capital One Arena
|
|- style="background:#;"
| 71
| March 23
| Detroit
| 
|
|
|
| Fiserv Forum
|
|- style="background:#;"
| 72
| March 25
| Houston
| 
|
|
|
| Fiserv Forum
|
|- style="background:#;"
| 73
| March 27
| Washington
| 
|
|
|
| Fiserv Forum
|
|- style="background:#;"
| 74
| March 29
| Dallas
| 
|
|
|
| Fiserv Forum
|
|- style="background:#;"
| 75
| April 1
| Toronto
| 
|
|
|
| Fiserv Forum
|
|- style="background:#;"
| 76
| April 3
| @ Toronto
| 
|
|
|
| Scotiabank Arena
|
|- style="background:#;"
| 77
| April 5
| @ Boston
| 
|
|
|
| TD Garden
|
|- style="background:#;"
| 78
| April 7
| @ Philadelphia
| 
|
|
|
| Wells Fargo Center
|
|- style="background:#;"
| 79
| April 9
| Brooklyn
| 
|
|
|
| Fiserv Forum
|
|- style="background:#;"
| 80
| April 11
| @ Cleveland
| 
|
|
|
| Rocket Mortgage FieldHouse
|
|- style="background:#;"
| 81
| April 12
| Atlanta
| 
|
|
|
| Fiserv Forum
|
|- style="background:#;"
| 82
| April 15
| @ Brooklyn
| 
|
|
|
| Barclays Center
|

Playoffs 

|- style="background:#fcc;"
| 1
| August 18
| Orlando
| 
| Giannis Antetokounmpo (31)
| Giannis Antetokounmpo (17)
| Giannis Antetokounmpo (7)
| HP Field HouseNo in-person attendance
| 0–1
|- style="background:#cfc;"
| 2
| August 20
| Orlando
| 
| Giannis Antetokounmpo (28)
| Giannis Antetokounmpo (20)
| Eric Bledsoe (7)
| HP Field HouseNo in-person attendance
| 1–1
|- style="background:#cfc;"
| 3
| August 22
| @ Orlando
| 
| Giannis Antetokounmpo (35)
| Giannis Antetokounmpo (11)
| Eric Bledsoe (8)
| HP Field HouseNo in-person attendance
| 2–1
|- style="background:#cfc;"
| 4
| August 24
| @ Orlando
| 
| Giannis Antetokounmpo (31)
| Giannis Antetokounmpo (15)
| Giannis Antetokounmpo (8)
| HP Field HouseNo in-person attendance
| 3–1
|- style="background:#cfc;"
| 5
| August 29
| Orlando
| 
| Giannis Antetokounmpo (28)
| Giannis Antetokounmpo (17)
| Eric Bledsoe (8)
| AdventHealth ArenaNo in-person attendance
| 4–1

|- style="background:#fcc;"
| 1
| August 31
| Miami
| 
| Khris Middleton (28)
| Giannis Antetokounmpo (10)
| Giannis Antetokounmpo (9)
| HP Field HouseNo in-person attendance
| 0–1
|- style="background:#fcc;"
| 2
| September 2
| Miami
| 
| Giannis Antetokounmpo (29)
| Giannis Antetokounmpo (14)
| Khris Middleton (8)
| HP Field HouseNo in-person attendance
| 0–2
|- style="background:#fcc;"
| 3
| September 4
| @ Miami
| 
| Brook Lopez (22)
| Giannis Antetokounmpo (16)
| Giannis Antetokounmpo (9)
| HP Field HouseNo in-person attendance
| 0–3
|- style="background:#cfc;"
| 4
| September 6
| @ Miami
| 
| Khris Middleton (36)
| Eric Bledsoe (10)
| Khris Middleton (8)
| AdventHealth ArenaNo in-person attendance
| 1–3
|- style="background:#fcc;"
| 5
| September 8
| Miami
| 
| Khris Middleton (23)
| Brook Lopez (14)
| Eric Bledsoe (9)
| HP Field HouseNo in-person attendance
| 1–4

Transactions

Overview

Trades

Free agency

Additions

Subtractions

References

Milwaukee Bucks seasons
Milwaukee Bucks
Milwaukee Bucks
Milwaukee Bucks